Shingle Mill Run is a tributary of West Branch Fishing Creek in Sullivan County, Pennsylvania, in the United States. The stream has one named tributary, Bearwallow Run. Shingle Mill Run is designated as an Exceptional Value stream and has a population of native trout. The stream has high water quality and is slightly acidic. Boulder Colluvium and bedrock consisting of sandstone and shale can be found near the stream.

Course
Shingle Mill Run begins in a valley in Davidson Township. It flows east for approximately a mile and its valley becomes progressively deeper. The stream then turns east-southeast for several tenths of a mile. It then receives its first and only named tributary, Bearwallow Run. At this point, the stream turns east for nearly a mile before exiting its valley and reaching its confluence with West Branch Fishing Creek.

Tributaries
Shingle Mill Run has one named tributary, which is known as Bearwallow Run.

Hydrology
A 1980 report stated that Shingle Mill Run had high water quality.

The water temperature of Shingle Mill Run was measured four times in the Fishing Creek Watershed Study between June 2010 and April 2011. The highest water temperature, occurred on June 18, 2010 and the second-highest water temperature, occurred on November 13, 2010. The lowest water temperature, occurred on January 4, 2011.

The specific conductivity of Shingle Mill Run was measured four times in the Fishing Creek Watershed Study between June 2010 and April 2011. The highest specific conductivity, 16 micro-siemens per centimeter, occurred on June 18, 2010. The second-highest specific conductivity, 12 micro-siemens per centimeter, occurred on November 13, 2010. Values of 11 micro-siemens per centimeter were recorded on January 4, 2011 and April 9, 2011.

In the Fishing Creek Watershed Study, the pH of Shingle Mill Run was measured four times between June 2010 and April 2011. The highest value, 6.07, occurred on June 18, 2010 and November 13, 2010. The second-lowest value, 5.50, occurred on January 4, 2011 and the lowest value, 5.17, occurred on April 9, 2011.

Geography and geology

Shingle Mill Run has a high gradient and is designated as a High-Gradient Clearwater Creek. The stream is in the vicinity of North Mountain.

Shingle Mill Run is on Boulder Colluvium in its lower reaches. The surface in these areas consists largely of boulders made of quartz, sandstone, or conglomerate. Further upstream, in the stream's middle reaches, bedrock consisting of shale and sandstone is present. The headwaters of the stream are also on Boulder Colluvium.

Watershed
The stream's mouth is in the United States Geological Survey quadrangle of Elk Grove. However, its source is in the quadrangle of Sonestown. The stream is in the southern part of Davidson Township and is also in Pennsylvania State Game Lands Number 13.

Shingle Mill Run is the only named tributary of West Branch Fishing Creek to enter it from the right.

Shingle Mill Run is difficult to access.

History
Shingle Mill Run was entered into the Geographic Names Information System on August 2, 1979. Its identifier in the Geographic Names Information System is 1193346.

The 2001 Sullivan County Natural Areas Inventory recommended additional surveys of Shingle Mill Run. The water temperature, pH, and specific conductivity of the stream were measured during the Fishing Creek Watershed Study managed by Matthew Opdyke in 2010 and 2011.

Biology
The entire drainage basin of Shingle Mill Run is designated as an Exceptional Value stream. This designation is the highest level of protection regulated by the water quality standards of Chapter 93. The basin is also designated as a Migratory Fishery. The stream is designated by the Pennsylvania Department of Environmental Protection for use for aquatic life. It attains the standards for this use. The stream is inhabited by native trout.

A conifer swamp is located at the headwaters of Shingle Mill Run. The swamp has the potential to serve as a habitat for rare species.

See also
Big Run (West Branch Fishing Creek), next tributary of West Branch Fishing Creek going downstream
Deep Hollow (West Branch Fishing Creek), next tributary of West Branch Fishing Creek going upstream
List of tributaries of Fishing Creek (North Branch Susquehanna River)

References

Rivers of Sullivan County, Pennsylvania
Tributaries of Fishing Creek (North Branch Susquehanna River)
Rivers of Pennsylvania